Mount Ratz is a mountain located just west of the Stikine River, about  east of the British Columbia-Alaska border. It is the highest peak in the Stikine Icecap and of the Boundary Ranges which in turn form part of the Coast Mountains. Thus making it one of Canada's Ultra peaks.

Mount Ratz is named for William F. Ratz, Dominion Land Surveyor and engineer-in-charge of surveying the Taku, Whiting and Stikine Rivers, who died on February 6, 1909.

"I regret to have to record the death of Mr. W.F. Ratz which occurred in Ottawa on February 6. Mr. Ratz had been employed on the Alaska survey since 1905. He carried out demarcation of the line at [Tsirku] river (Chilkat district), and in part between Taku Inlet and Whiting river. During the last two years he was engaged on the topographical survey between Whiting and Stikine rivers, not the least difficult section of a very difficult survey. His success in carrying this to completion in a relatively short time is a testimony of his capability as a surveyor as well as to his personal energy. His death, at the early age of 25, is a serious loss to the profession and to the public service."

Report of the Chief Astronomer to the Deputy Minister of the Interior, Canada, for the year ending March 31, 1909, p.17; republished in Report of the International Boundary Commission, 1952, footnote p.79.

See also
 Highest mountain peaks of Canada
 List of the most prominent summits of North America
 Table of the most isolated major summits of North America

References

External links
 "Mount Ratz, British Columbia" on Peakbagger

Boundary Ranges
Three-thousanders of British Columbia
Cassiar Land District